Dro Chungsang Ormang (? – ?) was a general of Tibetan Empire who served as Lönchen during the reign of Me Agtsom.

According to the Tibetan Annals, Dro Chungsang succeeded as the Lönchen after We Tadra Khonglo's execution in 728. He was ordered to convene winter coalitions in 726, 729, 731, 732, 743 and 747; and convened a summer coalition in 742. He was ordered to collect food supplies on people in 730. 'A-zha launched a rebellion against Tibet in 735 and was put down by him in the next year. He was later succeeded by another general named Bel Kyesang Dongtsab.

References
 Old Tibetan Annals (version I), I.T.J. 0750
 Old Tibetan Chronicle, P.T. 1287

8th-century Tibetan people
People of the Tibetan Empire